Maria of Bavaria can refer to:

Maria Anna of Bavaria (disambiguation), several people
Duchess Maria Antonia of Bavaria (1724–1780), German composer, singer, harpsichordist and patron
Maria Josepha of Bavaria (1739–1767), Holy Roman Empress
Maria Sophie of Bavaria (1841–1925), the last queen consort of the Kingdom of the Two Sicilies
Princess Maria Elisabeth of Bavaria (1914–2011)